The Rosemarkie transmitting station is a broadcasting and telecommunications facility, situated close to the town of Rosemarkie, Scotland, in Highland. It is owned and operated by Arqiva.

Coverage
Coverage includes the areas around the Moray Firth, in the Highland region of Scotland, including up to Helmsdale in the north, Elgin to the east, Dingwall to the west and the northern shores of Loch Ness to the south. This also includes the city of Inverness.

History
The station was built in 1957 by the BBC to bring BBC Television to North East Scotland for the first time. The 405-line monochrome transmissions were on channel 2, Band I VHF.

When colour UHF television began in 1970, the site was chosen over the nearby IBA owned station at Mounteagle to carry these broadcasts. Both the UHF and VHF services continued in tandem until 1985, when VHF television was discontinued in the UK.

Channels listed by frequency

Digital television

20 October 2010 – present
Digital switchover was completed at Rosemarkie. All analogue television was switched off and the new post-DSO multiplexes took over the analogue frequencies plus a few new ones.

Analogue radio (FM)

Former Services

Analogue television

16 August 1957 – 11 July 1970
405-line BBC television arrived in the northeast of Scotland.

11 July 1970 – October 1973
BBC Two UHF colour television commenced.

October 1973 – 1 November 1982
BBC One and ITV UHF colour television commenced.

2 November 1982 – 3 January 1985
The UK's fourth UHF television channel started up.

3 January 1985 – 15 November 1998
The VHF 405-line system was discontinued across the UK, and from that point for the next 23 years, television from Rosemarkie was the originally-intended four channels on UHF only.

Analogue and Digital television

15 November 1998 – 6 October 2010
The initial roll-out of digital television involved running the digital services interleaved (and at low ERP) with the existing analogue services.

6 October 2010 – 20 October 2010
Digital Switchover commenced at Rosemarkie, with analogue BBC Two being switched off on channel 45 and BBC Mux 1 being switched off on channel 47+. Channel 45 was reused by the new BBC A multiplex at full post-DSO power (20 kW) and using 64-QAM with 8k carriers.

See also
List of masts
List of tallest buildings and structures in Great Britain
List of radio stations in the United Kingdom

References

External links
Entry for Rosemarkie at The Transmission Gallery
Rosemarkie Transmitter at thebigtower.com

Transmitter sites in Scotland
1957 establishments in Scotland
Black Isle
Infrastructure completed in 1957
Buildings and structures in Highland (council area)